Sir James Long, 5th Baronet (1682 – 16 March 1729) was an English landowner and Tory politician who sat in the English and British House of Commons between 1695 and 1729.

The son of James Long and his wife Susan Strangways, he was born at Athelhampton and baptised at Melbury House, Dorchester, Dorset in 1682.  He was the grandson of Sir James Long, 2nd Baronet and brother of the celebrated Kit-Cat Club beauty Anne Long (c. 1681 – 1711). He succeeded to the baronetcy on the death of his brother Sir Giles Long, 4th Baronet, in 1698. He married Henrietta Greville on 6 June 1702 at St Martin in the Fields, Westminster, London. She was the daughter of Fulke Greville, 5th Baron Brooke and his wife Sarah Dashwood, and a descendant of the Earl of Bedford. On the death of his grandmother Lady Dorothy Long in 1710, he inherited the Draycot Estate together with Athelhampton Manor, other land in Wiltshire and Dorset, and an estate near Ripon in Yorkshire. He used the inheritance to purchase more land in Dorset, adjacent to Athelhampton, in the manors of Burleston and Southover.

Long was returned as Member of Parliament for Chippenham at the 1705 English general election and again in 1708 and 1710. At the 1715 British general election, he was returned as MP for Wootton Bassett. He did not stand at the 1722 British general election  but was returned as MP for Wiltshire in 1727.

Long died at his London residence in Jermyn Street on 16 March 1729 from apoplexy. There were four daughters and two sons from  his marriage. Four of his six children survived him,  including Robert who succeeded to the baronetcy. His daughter Susanna  created a scandal by marrying her mother's gardener in 1732, as noted in his diary by Viscount Perceval, (related distantly by marriage to the Longs). Lady Henrietta Long died 19 May 1765 at Bath.

Further reading 
Inheriting the Earth: The Long Family's 500 Year Reign in Wiltshire; Cheryl Nicol
Hand of Fate. The History of the Longs, Wellesleys and the Draycot Estate in Wiltshire. Tim Couzens 2001

References 

The Gentleman's Magazine 1765

1682 births
1729 deaths
Members of the Parliament of Great Britain for Wiltshire
James
Tory MPs (pre-1834)
English MPs 1705–1707
British MPs 1707–1708
British MPs 1708–1710
British MPs 1710–1713
British MPs 1715–1722
British MPs 1727–1734
Baronets in the Baronetage of England